Delminichthys is a genus of cyprinid fish which is found in the karst region of the Balkans, Eastern Europe. Until 2006 it was considered part of the genus Phoxinellus. It currently contains four species.

Species
 Delminichthys adspersus (Heckel, 1843)
 Delminichthys ghetaldii (Steindachner, 1882) (includes previous Phoxinellus pstrossii)
 Delminichthys jadovensis (Zupančič & Bogutskaya, 2002)
 Delminichthys krbavensis (Zupančič & Bogutskaya, 2002)

References
 

 
Cyprinid fish of Europe
Ray-finned fish genera